Nora Webster is a historical novel by Colm Tóibín, published October 7, 2014 by Scribner.

Reception 
Nora Webster is a New York Times best seller.

The book received starred reviews from Kirkus Reviews and Booklist, as well as positive reviews from Publishers Weekly and Shelf Awareness.

Kirkus called Nora Webster "[a] novel of mourning, healing and awakening," noting that "its plainspoken eloquence never succumbs to the sentimentality its heroine would reject."

The audiobook, narrated by Fiona Shaw, received positive reviews from Booklist and Library Journal.

Kirkus Reviews named Nora Webster one of the best fiction novels of the year.

References 

2014 Irish novels
Novels set in Ireland
Novels set in the 1960s
Charles Scribner's Sons books